Eyach  is a river of Baden-Württemberg, Germany. It flows for 50 kilometres. It is a right tributary of the Neckar. It passes through Balingen and Haigerloch, and flows into the Neckar near Starzach.

Geography

History 
The Eyach has its source north of Pfeffingen (a district of Albstadt) at an altitude of 833 metres, only a few hundred metres from the European watershed  and a tributary of the Danube, the Schmiecha, which has its source there. At Eyach at a height of 372 m from the right it flows into the Neckar. Its mean discharge at the mouth is 3.23 m³/s.

Tributaries 

From source to meadow

Innentalbach, right
Buchbach, left
Wünschtalbach, right
Kieserstalbach
Irrenbach
Rohrbach
Ochsentalbach, left
Käsentaler Bach, right
Meßstetter Talbach, left
Kehlenbach, right
Bruckbach (!), left
(unnamed creek from the Reuten), left
Lauterbach, left
Steinbach, left
Eltschbach, right
Zerrenstallbach, left
Hakenbach, left
Strichgraben, left
Schalksbach, right
Rappentalbach, left
Bitzgraben, right
Grundbach, left
Beutenbach, left
Böllbach, right 
Hühnerbach, left
Steinach, left
Etzelbach, right
Reichenbach, right
Talgraben, left
Kaunterbach, left
Schnürgraben, left
Talbach, right
Klingenbach, right
Talbach, right
Mittelsbach, left
Dietenbach, right
Rötenbach, left
Sulzbach, right
Stunzach, left
Bruckbach (!), right
Butzengraben, left
Laibebach, left
Feldbach, right
Kegelbach, left
Kohlwaldgraben, right

Places by the river 
On its almost 50 km long way to the northwest the Eyach crosses or passes through the following communities:

 Albstadt 
 Balingen 
 Haigerloch 
 Horb am Neckar 
 Starzach

At Eyach or the train station Eyach, two kilometers west of the village Börstingen (a district of Starzach), the Eyach flows into the Neckar.

Mofette
In Bad Imnau carbon dioxide was found in an underground inlet to the river. Today this water is sold under the name Apollo in bottles.

See also
List of rivers of Baden-Württemberg

References

Rivers of Baden-Württemberg
Rivers of Germany